Jorge A. Herrera Soto (born September 4, 1972) is a former international freestyle swimmer from Puerto Rico. He started swimming at the age of seven in Round Hill Swimming Team.

Among other competitions, Herrera participated in the 1990 Central American and Caribbean Games in Mexico, the 1991 6th World Swimming Championships in Australia, the 1991 Pan American Games in Cuba, the Pan Pacific Swimming Championships in Edmonton, Canada, and the 1992 Summer Olympics.

His best World Ranking result was a 10th place @ the 6th World Championships in Perth in the Men's 400m Freestyle (3:54.01). Herrera is best known for winning two silver medals and one bronze at the 1991 Pan American Games in Havana, Cuba, and five medals (two gold, two silver and a bronze) in the 1990 Centroamerican Games in Mexico. He currently holds national records in the 400 and 1,500 m freestyle since 1991.

Life after swimming

He studied medicine and became a doctor in the Dominican Republic. He does not practice medicine, but works in a related field as general manager of a surgical implant company.

Competitions
Herrera participated in:

1983 CCCAN in Dominican Republic,
1984 CISC in Trinidad and Tobago,
1985 CCCAN in Mexico,
1986 CISC in Curaçao,
1987 CCCAN in Salinas, Puerto Rico,
1988 CAC in Mexico and CISC in Dominican Republic,
1989 CCCAN in Venezuela.
1990 CAC in México
1991 6th World Swimming Championship
1991 Pan American Games in Cuba
1991 Pan Pacific Games, Edmonton Canadá
1992 Olympic Games, in Barcelona

References

1972 births
Living people
Puerto Rican male swimmers
Puerto Rican male freestyle swimmers
Swimmers at the 1991 Pan American Games
Swimmers at the 1992 Summer Olympics
Olympic swimmers of Puerto Rico
Pan American Games silver medalists for Puerto Rico
Pan American Games bronze medalists for Puerto Rico
Pan American Games medalists in swimming
Central American and Caribbean Games gold medalists for Puerto Rico
Competitors at the 1990 Central American and Caribbean Games
Central American and Caribbean Games medalists in swimming
Medalists at the 1991 Pan American Games